Gambero Rosso was a restaurant in San Vincenzo, Tuscany. Its chef was Fulvio Pierangelini.

The restaurant was voted 12th best in the world in Restaurant Top 50 2008, and was awarded 2 stars by the Michelin Guide.

It was closed in November 2008.

Notes

Restaurants in Italy
Defunct restaurants in Italy
Restaurants disestablished in 2008
2008 disestablishments in Italy